Super Rare Games Limited is a video game publisher and distributor based in London, England. The company releases limited print games for the Nintendo Switch which can be purchased from their website. Super Rare Games was founded by George Perkins and is currently led by Perkins, Ryan Brown, Stuart Townsend, Verity Murphy, and Lindsey Reed.

Business model 
Each game published and distributed by Super Rare Games is only printed once with a hard limit on number of copies produced. New games are announced once a month. According to Perkins, the reasoning behind this is "when you release [too] much content, you lose the collectability of having a set".

In a newsletter sent to subscribers on 27 March 2019, company lead Perkins announced a plan for Super Rare Games to increase the amount of units per release "from 3-4,000 to 4-6,000k" for the remaining titles in 2019.

Releases

References 

British companies established in 2018
Software companies based in London
Video game companies of the United Kingdom
Video game publishers